Ormia brevicornis is a species of bristle fly in the family Tachinidae. It is found in North America.

Subspecies
These two subspecies belong to the species Ormia brevicornis:
 Ormia brevicornis brevicornis Townsend, 1919
 Ormia brevicornis nuttingi (Sabrosky, 1953)

References

Further reading

 
 

Tachininae
Articles created by Qbugbot
Insects described in 1919